Daniel Hunt Janzen (born January 18, 1939, in Milwaukee, Wisconsin) is an American evolutionary ecologist, and conservationist. He divides his time between his professorship in biology at the University of Pennsylvania, where he is the DiMaura Professor of Conservation Biology, and his research and field work in Costa Rica.

Janzen and his wife Winifred Hallwachs have catalogued the biodiversity of Costa Rica. Through a DNA barcoding initiative, Janzen and geneticist Paul Hebert have registered over 500,000 specimens representing more than 45,000 species, which has led to the identification of cryptic species of near-identical appearance that differ in terms of genetics and ecological niche.
 
They helped to establish the Area de Conservación Guanacaste World Heritage Site, one of the oldest, largest and most successful habitat restoration projects in the world.

Early life and education
Daniel Hunt Janzen was born January 18, 1939, in Milwaukee, Wisconsin. His father, Daniel Hugo Janzen, grew up in a Mennonite farming community and served as Director of the United States Fish and Wildlife Service. His father and mother, Miss Floyd Clark Foster of Greenville, South Carolina, were married on April 29, 1937.

Janzen obtained his B.Sc. degree in biology from the University of Minnesota in 1961, and his Ph.D. from the University of California, Berkeley in 1965.

Career 
In 1963, Janzen attended a two-month course in tropical biology taught in several field sites throughout Costa Rica. This Advanced Science Seminar in Tropical Biology was the precursor to a Fundamentals in Tropical Biology course, which Janzen designed for the Organization for Tropical Studies (OTS), a consortium of several North American and Costa Rican universities. Janzen went back in 1965 as an instructor and has lectured in at least one of the three yearly courses every year since.

Janzen taught at the University of Kansas (1965–1968), the University of Chicago (1969–1972), and the University of Michigan (1972–1976) before joining the faculty at the University of Pennsylvania.  There he is the DiMaura Professor of Conservation Biology, and his research and field work in Costa Rica.

Janzen has also held teaching positions in Venezuela (Universidad de Oriente, Cumaná in 1965–66; Universidad de los Los Andes, Mérida in 1973), and in Puerto Rico (Universidad de Puerto Rico, Río Piedras, 1969).

Research
Janzen's early work focused on the careful and meticulous documentation of species in Costa Rica, and in particular on ecological processes and the dynamics and evolution of animal-plant interactions. 
In 1967, for example he described the phenological specialization of bee-pollinated species of Bignoniaceae, amongst them a "kind of mass flowering", which Alwyn Howard Gentry in his classification of flowering named Type 4 or "big bang" strategy.

Miguel Altieri in his textbook Agroecology: The Science of Sustainable Agriculture says: "Janzen's 1973 article on tropical agroecosystems was the first widely read evaluation of why tropical agricultural systems might function differently from those of the temperate zones".

In 1985, realizing that the area in which they worked was threatened, Janzen and Hallwachs expanded the focus of their work to include tropical forest restoration, expansion (through land purchases) and conservation. They employed the help of local Costa Ricans, converting their farming skills into parataxonomy, a term they coined in the late 1980s. As of 2017, some 10,000 new species in the Area de Conservacion Guanacaste have been identified thanks to the efforts of parataxonomists.

Through a DNA barcoding initiative with geneticist Paul Hebert, they have registered over 500,000 specimens representing more than 45,000 species, which has led to the identification of cryptic species of near-identical appearance that differ in terms of genetics and ecological niche. Janzen and Hallwachs have supported species barcoding initiatives at both national and international levels through the Instituto Nacional de Biodiversidad (INBio), CBOL (Consortium for the Barcode of Life) and iBOL (International Barcode of Life).

Coevolution of plants and animals
 Coevolution of a mutualistic system in New World tropics between species of Acacia (Mimosoideae; Leguminosae), v. gr., Acacia cornigera, and the ant Pseudomyrmex ferruginea (Formicidae). Acacia spp in the Neotropics are protected by ants against defoliation; for this, the ants are rewarded by means of special organs and physiology that Acacia has evolved.
 Spondias mombin (Anacardiaceae) lost its megafauna seed dispersers in the Pleistocene. Between fire in open pastures and seed predation by bruchid beetles in closed-canopy forest, S. mombin does not stand a chance. But, today, in Guanacaste, seeds are dispersed by White-tailed deer (Odocoileus virginianus) and some 15 other mammals, that feed mostly in forest edges, where bruchids are less likely to find the seeds and fires are not so frequent.

Tropical habitat restoration
Tropical dry forests are the world's most threatened forest ecosystems. In middle America there were 550 000 km2 of dry forests at the beginning of the 16th century; today, less than 0.08% (440 km2 ) remains. They have been cleared, burnt and replaced by pastures for cattle raising, at an ever-faster rate during the last 500 years.

In 1985, realizing that widespread development in northwestern Costa Rica was rapidly decimating the forest in which they conducted their research, Janzen and Hallwachs  expanded the focus of their work. Janzen and his wife helped to establish the Area de Conservación Guanacaste World Heritage Site (ACG), one of the oldest, largest and most successful habitat restoration projects in the world. This eventually became the  Área de Conservación Guanacaste, located just south of the Costa Rica-Nicaragua border, between the Pacific Ocean and the Cordillera de Tilaran which integrated four different national parks. It is one of the oldest, largest and most successful habitat restoration projects in the world. The park exemplifies their beliefs about how a park should be run. It is known as a center of biological research, forest restoration and community outreach.

Habitat restoration is not a simple matter. Not only must one fight against hundreds of years of ecological degradation, manifested in the form of altered drainage patterns, hard to eradicate pastures, compacted soils, exhausted seed banks, diminished adult and propagule stocks, proliferation of fire-resistant and unpalatable weeds from the old world tropics and sub-tropics. 
Also one is faced with the difficulties of changing a culture which coevolved with, profited from and can become miserable with such a system.

For this reason ACG was conceived as a cultural restoration project, which, to paraphrase its natural counterpart, ought to be grown as well. ACG integrates complementary processes of experimentation, habitat restoration and cultural development.
The techniques used include: 
 Active restoration, artificial dispersal of propagules from plant species native to the Guanacaste habitats
 Passive restoration by means of fire, anti-poaching and herbivore control
 Ecological education and sensibilisation

Personal life
Janzen is married to ecologist Winifred Hallwachs, who is also his frequent research partner. Of Hallwachs, Janzen has said, "We did these things together," and "we are very much together in perceiving things the same things....Since I'm the vocal member, it's then attributed to me. But I would say these ideas and directions and thoughts and actions are easily fifty-fifty attributable."

Honorary distinctions
Janzen has been subject to recognition many times in the US, as well as in Europe and Latin America; the monetary endowments of these prizes have been invested in the trust fund of the ACG or another of his conservation's projects in Costa Rica; amongst the 19 prizes and distinctions, the following are the most important:
 1975, The Henry Allan Gleason Award, Botanical Society of America
 1984, Crafoord Prize: Coevolutionary ecology. Royal Swedish Academy of Sciences
 1985, Distinguished Teaching Award, University of Pennsylvania
 1987, The Berkeley Citation for Distinguished Achievement and Notable Service to the University,  University of California, Berkeley
 1987, Hijo Ilustre de Guanacaste (awarded by the Governor of Guanacaste province)
 1987, Global 500 Roll of Honour, UNEP
 1989, MacArthur Fellowship
 1989, Leidy Award, Philadelphia Academy of Natural Sciences
 1991, Founder's Council Award of Merit, Field Museum of Natural History
 1992, Member, National Academy of Sciences, USA
 1993, Award for Improvement of Costa Rican Quality of Life, Universidad de Costa Rica (co award with W. Hallwachs).
 1994, Silver Medal Award, International Society of Chemical Ecology.
 1995, Global Service Award, Society for Conservation Biology
 1996, Honorary Doctor of Science, University of Minnesota.
 1996, Thomas G. and Louise E. DiMaura Endowed Term Chair, University of Pennsylvania
 1997, Kyoto Prize (Basic Sciences Field), Inamori Foundation
 2002, Albert Einstein World Award of Science, Consejo Cultural Mundial, (Mexico)
 2002, Honorary Fellow of the Association for Tropical Biology (and Conservation) (ATBC)
 2006, Winner, National Outdoor Book Awards (NOBA), for 100 Caterpillars: Portraits from the Tropical Forests of Costa Rica (2006), Design & Artistic Merit Category.
 2011, BBVA Foundation Frontiers of Knowledge Award of Ecology and Conservation Biology for his pioneering work in tropical ecology and his contributions to the conservation of endangered tropical ecosystems throughout the world, drawing on an understanding of plant-animal interactions. Janzen acknowledged the role of his wife and long-term research partner, ecologist Winnie Hallwachs, to the work being recognized.
 2013, Wege Foundation $5 million grant to the  Guanacaste Dry Forest Conservation Fund (GDFCF), founded in 1997 by Dan Janzen and Winnie Hallwachs.
 2014, Blue Planet Prize, from the Asahi Glass Foundation

See also
Ecological fitting
Janzen–Connell hypothesis

Publications
The following is a selection of Janzen's publications that are not otherwise listed.

References

External links

 Costa Rica : Paradise Reclaimed, Profile of Dan Janzen in Nature, MacArthur Foundation, WNET (Television station : New York, N.Y., 1987)  
 Faculty page at University of Pennsylvania

1939 births
Living people
Albert Einstein World Award of Science Laureates
American ecologists
Kyoto laureates in Basic Sciences
MacArthur Fellows
Members of the United States National Academy of Sciences
United States Fish and Wildlife Service personnel
University of Minnesota College of Biological Sciences alumni
University of Pennsylvania faculty
University of Pennsylvania Department of Biology faculty
University of Michigan faculty
21st-century American biologists